Arthur Radebaugh (1906–1974) was an American futurist, illustrator, airbrush artist, and industrial designer. He produced a significant body of work for the automotive industry. He was noted for his artistic experimentation with fluorescent paint under black light, an interest that stemmed from his design work for the U.S. Army. From 1958 to 1963 he produced the syndicated Sunday comic strip Closer Than We Think! for the Chicago Tribune-New York News Syndicate.

References

External links
 Closer Than We Think documentary by Brett Ryan Bonowicz (2017), at the Internet Movie Database
 McGurk, Caitlin. "Found in the Collection: Arthur Radebaugh’s 'Closer Than We Think'," Billy Ireland Cartoon Library and Museum website (December 27, 2012) — profile and gallery of original images
 "Radebaugh: Arthur Radebaugh, 1906-1974" — profile and gallery of images at Cartype.com.
 Novak, Matt. "Before the Jetsons, Arthur Radebaugh Illustrated the Future: In the 1950s and ‘60s, the newspaper cartoonist dreamed up a madcap American utopia, filled with flying cars and fantastical skyscrapers," Smithsonian Magazine (April 2012).
 Art Radebaugh's Future Past blog by curators of the exhibit "Radebaugh: The Future We Were Promised"

American illustrators
American comics artists
1906 births
1974 deaths